The BLU-108 is an air-delivered submunition, containing four further smart "Skeet" warheads.  The system is manufactured by Textron Systems Weapon & Sensor Systems since 1992. The BLU-108 is released from a munitions dispenser, with a parachute being used to slow its descent. It then fires the four rapidly rotating skeets, which use multi-mode optical sensors to identify a variety of targets ranging from tanks and missile launchers to railway locomotives and landed aircraft. When the skeet passes over what it considers a high priority target (this priority can be changed prior to employment), it fires a 0.9 kg (2 lb) explosively formed penetrator providing armor-piercing and incendiary effects, as well as a fragmentation ring meant to damage any soft targets, primarily enemy persons, in the immediate vicinity of the target.

BLU-108/B specifications 
 Length: 78.8 cm (31.0 in)
 Diameter: 13.3 cm (5.25 in)
 Maximum lateral dimension: 18.4 cm (7.25 in)
 Weight: 29.5 kg (65 lb)

Skeet specifications 
 Height: 9.5 cm (3.75 in)
 Diameter: 12.7 cm (5.0 in)
 Weight: 3.4 kg (7.5 lb)
 Seeker: Dual-mode active (laser) and passive (infrared) sensors
 Explosive: 945 g (2.08 lb) Octol
 Kill mechanism: Explosively formed penetrator and fragmentation

Weapon systems 
 AGM-154B Joint Standoff Weapon
 CBU-97 Sensor Fuzed Weapon
 U-ADD (Universal aerial delivery dispenser)

References

External links 
 BLU-108 - Textron Defense Systems
 BLU-108/B Submunition - Global Security

Submunitions
Aerial bombs of the United States
Fire-and-forget weapons
Military equipment introduced in the 1990s
Textron
Anti-tank weapons